Eriks Jekabsons (born 1959) is a Latvian politician who served as a Minister of Internal Affairs of Latvia.

Biography
Born on April 3, 1959 in Riga, he studied at the Riga Industrial Polytechnic and obtained a degree in furniture production. Between 1978 and 1980, he served in the Soviet Army and studied at the Latvian State Institute of Physical Culture. 

Formerly a member of Latvia's First Party, he left the party in 2005. In the same year, he married Natalija, his second marriage.

References

Living people
1959 births
Latvian politicians